Phyllonorycter spinicolella, also known as the sloe midget, is a moth of the family Gracillariidae, first described by the German entomologist Philipp Christoph Zeller in 1846. It is probably present in all of Europe.

The wingspan is 6–8 mm. The posterior tarsi are  whitish. Forewings are golden-ochreous; a white median streak from base to near middle, dark-margined above; dorsum narrowly white towards base; four costal and three dorsal shining white anteriorly dark-margined wedge-shaped spots, first dorsal sometimes connected with basal streak; a blackish elongate apical dot. Hindwings are light grey. The larva is green- whitish; dorsal line dark green; head pale greenish.

Adults are on wing in May and again in August in two generations per year.

The larvae feed on cherry plum (Prunus cerasifera), European plum (Prunus domestica), bird cherry (Prunus padus) and blackthorn (Prunus spinosa). They mine the leaves of their host plant creating a lower-surface, strongly inflated tentifom mine between to side veins. The lower epidermis is folded. Pupation takes place in a white cocoon and the frass is deposited in a corner of the mine.

References

spinicolella
Leaf miners
Moths described in 1846
Moths of Europe
Taxa named by Philipp Christoph Zeller